McGahn is a surname. Notable people with the surname include:

 Don McGahn (born 1968), American lawyer and White House Counsel and Assistant to the President
 Joseph McGahn (c. 1917 – 1999), American obstetrician and politician

See also
Bryan McGan (1848-1894) Australian cricketer
 McGahan
 Gahn